James Bruce Falls (unofficial name) is a waterfall in British Columbia, Canada, the highest-measured waterfall of North America and ninth-tallest in the world.

Located in Princess Louisa Marine Provincial Park, it stems from a small snowfield and cascades  down to Princess Louisa Inlet. Two parallel streams, for which the falls are named, come from this snowfield, and do not have consistent flow throughout the year and during hot summers they usually dry up. The stream flows into Loquilts Creek, which empties into the inlet via the better known Chatterbox Falls.

See also
List of waterfalls by height
List of waterfalls of British Columbia

References

External links

Waterfalls of British Columbia
Sunshine Coast (British Columbia)
New Westminster Land District
Tiered waterfalls